HD 143361 is a star in the southern constellation Norma. With an apparent visual magnitude of 9.20, this star is too dim to be seen with the naked eye.

This is a G-type main sequence star with a stellar classification of G6 V. It has around 95% of the Sun's mass and is around 8.1 billion years old.

Planetary system
In October 2008 the planet HD 143361 b was reported to be orbiting this star. This object was detected using the radial velocity method during an astronomical survey conducted by the Magellan Planet Search Program using the MIKE echelle spectrograph on the 6.5-m Magellan II (Clay) telescope.

See also
 List of extrasolar planets

References

External links
 

143361
078521
Norma (constellation)
Planetary systems with one confirmed planet
G-type main-sequence stars
Durchmusterung objects
Binary stars